Climate drawdown refers to the future point in time when levels of greenhouse gas concentrations in the atmosphere stop climbing and start to steadily decline. Drawdown is a milestone in reversing climate change and eventually reducing global average temperatures. Project Drawdown refers to the nonprofit organization with the mission to help the world reach drawdown and stop catastrophic climate change quickly, safely, and equitably. In 2017, a publication titled "Drawdown" became a New York Times bestseller, where it highlighted and described different solutions and efforts available to help reach this goal.

Project Drawdown
Project Drawdown is a climate change mitigation project initiated by Paul Hawken and climate activist Amanda Joy Ravenhill.  

The main principles of the project are to:  

 Reduce sources by bringing emissions to zero and stopping pollution.
 Support sinks and uplift nature's carbon cycle.
 Improve society by fostering equality for all. 

Project Drawdown also organizes various solutions into groups that fit these principles to make up the Drawdown Framework. The Project Drawdown organization's website includes video lessons that explain the analysis and insights behind the efforts and research that make up the science behind the project. Central to the project is the compilation of a list of the "most substantive solutions to global warming." The list, which encompasses only technologically viable existing solutions, was compiled by a team of more than 200 scholars, scientists, policymakers, business leaders, and activists and is now online. The team measured and modeled each solution's carbon impact through the year 2050, its total and net cost to society, and its total lifetime savings. Project Drawdown uses different scenarios to assess what different changes to global climate efforts might look like. Scenario 1 shows a 2 °C temperature rise by 2100, while Scenario 2 shows a 1.5 °C temperature rise by 2100. Below is a table of the top ten solutions included on the organization's website, with the impacts of their respective emissions based on either. The measurements refer to the gigatons of  equivalent reduced/sequestered (2020–2050) with the minimum efforts required for the higher goal and the maximum efforts required for the lower goal.

Top ten solutions

Nine Sectors 

The interactive website lists nine sectors where immediate action is needed to limit catastrophic climate change. They are:

 Electricity: Electricity production gives rise to 25% of heat-trapping emissions globally. The solutions that apply to this sector include enhancing efficiency, shifting production (away from fossil fuels to solar energy/wind power/geothermal power), and improving/upgrading the system.
 Food, Agriculture, and Land Use: Agriculture and forestry activities generate 24% of greenhouse gas emissions worldwide. Solutions in this sector are focused on waste and diets, ecosystem protection, and better agricultural practices. Farming and forestry can also support the role of natural sinks, which help remove greenhouse gases from the atmosphere. 
 Industry: The industry is directly responsible for 21% of all heat-trapping emissions. The solutions in this sector include improving materials (as plastic, metals, and cement are some of the most common materials that need production improvement), utilizing waste, addressing refrigerants, and enhancing efficiency. The industry presents some of the biggest challenges for reducing emissions.
 Transportation: This sector is responsible for 14% of global greenhouse gas emissions. Solutions in this sector address alternatives (public transit, compact cities, intentional infrastructure), enhancing efficiency, and electrifying vehicles to completely replace petroleum. However substantial, these solutions have the potential to save money while avoiding pollution.
 Buildings: Buildings produce 6% of heat-trapping emissions worldwide. They also use more than half of all electricity, which creates a large impact on electricity-generated emissions. The solutions for this sector orient around enhancing efficiency, shifting energy sources, and addressing refrigerants.
 Health and Education: Currently, the human population totals 7.7 billion, and the United Nations estimates that number will grow to between 9.4 billion and 10.1 billion in 2050. Population interacts with the primary drivers of emissions, production and consumption. However, almost half of the consumption-related emissions are generated by just 10% of people globally, giving point to the critical note of disparities in emissions from high-income countries compared to low ones and between the wealthiest individuals and those of lesser means. The solutions for this sector are also focused on family planning, reproductive health, and education.
 Land Sinks: While the majority of heat-trapping emissions remain in the atmosphere, land sinks return 26% of human-caused emissions to Earth. This sector's solutions focus on protecting and restoring ecosystems, shifting agriculture practices, addressing waste and diets, and using degraded lands. (See also: Carbon sinks and land trusts)
 Coastal and Ocean Sinks: Oceans have absorbed at least 90% of the excess heat generated by recent climate changes and have taken up 20–30% of human-created carbon dioxide. Coastal and ocean sinks bring 17% of all heat-trapping emissions back to Earth. However, the more carbon dioxide in seawater makes the ocean more acidic and less hospitable. This also leads to a rise in water temperatures, marine heat waves, and sea levels. Solutions for coastal and ocean sinks center on ecosystem protection and restoration and improved agricultural practices.
 Engineered Sinks: The sheer quantity of excess greenhouse gases means that natural processes cannot do it all when it comes to carbon sequestration. Developing technologies show promise to help supplement previously mentioned natural sinks. Removing, capturing, and storing carbon are included in the central solution focus for this sector.

Book

Drawdown Review 
A 2020 review of the findings of the research that lead to the 2017 book was published as a 104-page PDF in 2020.

See also
 Azolla event
 Carbon sequestration

References

External links 

 Project Drawdown, headquartered in San Francisco, US
 Drawdown Europe Research Association, headquartered in Amsterdam, the Netherlands

Greenhouse gas emissions
Climate change mitigation